Violent Rome is an Italian 1975 poliziottesco film directed by Marino Girolami It obtained a great commercial success and launched the career of Maurizio Merli. The film is the first entry into the Commissioner Betti Trilogy and has two sequels, Violent Naples and A Special Cop in Action.

Cast 
 Maurizio Merli as Commissioner Betti 
 Richard Conte as Lawyer Sartori
 Silvano Tranquilli as capo della Squadra Mobile
 Ray Lovelock as Biondi
 John Steiner as Franco Spadoni aka 'Chiodo'
 Daniela Giordano as Lover of Betti
 Luciano Rossi as Delivery Man

Production
After the financial success of High Crime, producer Edmondo Amati offered director Enzo G. Castellari to direct another film in the same vein. Castellari stated that he asked for more money but could not come to an agreement with the producer which led to Amati calling Castellari's father Marino Girolami to direct the film and cast Maurizio Merli. The film was shot at Incir – De Paolis in Rome.

Release
Violent Rome was released on 13 August 1975 where it was distributed by Fida. The film grossed a total of 2,495,950,443 Italian lire domestically. In the United Kingdom the film was released as Street Killers. 
The film was followed by the sequel Violent Naples.

Notes

References

External links

1975 films
Poliziotteschi films
Films directed by Marino Girolami
Films scored by Guido & Maurizio De Angelis
1970s Italian films